Fruitport is a village in Muskegon County in the U.S. state of Michigan.  The population was 1,093 at the 2010 census. The community is located within Fruitport Charter Township.

Water and sewer utilities are provided by Fruitport Charter Township.

Fruitport is also known for its athletic programs, mainly from its successes in volleyball and wrestling. In volleyball, since 2001, the program has been a state finalist eight times, winning three state titles (2005, 2010, and 2011). In football the team in 2001 were state runners-up. The football program also produced Mike Teeter, who played defensive end at the University of Michigan, and in the NFL for the Minnesota Vikings and the Houston Oilers. In wrestling, the team has won two of the last three district titles, and has had a number of state qualifiers over the years, including sending six wrestlers to the state championships in 2014,.

Fruitport was founded by Edward L. Craw in 1868, who platted and named it as Crawville. It was renamed Fruitport a year later when the Pere Marquette Railroad built a station there, as the town was in the middle of a fertile fruit growing area and also a port. It incorporated as a village in 1891.

In an election on November 8, 2005, 306 residents voted to dissolve the village municipal corporation, while 155 voted no. However, a two-thirds majority (308 votes) was needed to dissolve the village.  This was the fourth time since 1979 that a proposal to dissolve the village was on the ballot for an election. In 1990, a proposal to disincorporate was defeated by a 2 to 1 margin while a proposal in 1998 failed by 41 votes.

Geography

Demographics

2010 census
As of the census of 2010, there were 1,093 people, 440 households, and 312 families residing in the village. The racial makeup of the village was 95.8% White, 1.5% African American, 0.2% Native American, 0.4% Asian, 1.1% from other races, and 1.1% from two or more races. Hispanic or Latino of any race were 2.0% of the population.

There were 440 households, of which 31.6% had children under the age of 18 living with them, 55.9% were married couples living together, 10.2% had a female householder with no husband present, 4.8% had a male householder with no wife present, and 29.1% were non-families. 23.0% of all households were made up of individuals, and 10.7% had someone living alone who was 65 years of age or older. The average household size was 2.48 and the average family size was 2.91.

The median age in the village was 43.6 years. 22.5% of residents were under the age of 18; 6.1% were between the ages of 18 and 24; 23.5% were from 25 to 44; 31.6% were from 45 to 64; and 16.3% were 65 years of age or older. The gender makeup of the village was 50.2% male and 49.8% female.

2000 census
As of the census of 2000, there were 1,124 people, 439 households, and 315 families residing in the village. The racial makeup of the village was 98.04% White, 0.09% African American, 0.44% Native American, 0.62% Asian, 0.27% from other races, and 0.53% from two or more races. Hispanic or Latino of any race were 1.42% of the population.

There were 439 households, out of which 30.5% had children under the age of 18 living with them, 59.9% were married couples living together, 8.2% had a female householder with no husband present, and 28.2% were non-families. 24.1% of all households were made up of individuals, and 9.8% had someone living alone who was 65 years of age or older.  The average household size was 2.55 and the average family size was 3.03.

In the village, the population was spread out, with 24.6% under the age of 18, 7.7% from 18 to 24, 28.8% from 25 to 44, 25.2% from 45 to 64, and 13.7% who were 65 years of age or older.  The median age was 38 years. For every 100 females, there were 100.4 males.  For every 100 females age 18 and over, there were 94.1 males.

The median income for a household in the village was $48,125, and the median income for a family was $54,917. Males had a median income of $38,362 versus $30,227 for females. The per capita income for the village was $22,364.  About 3.3% of families and 5.8% of the population were below the poverty line, including 6.8% of those under age 18 and none of those age 65 or over.

Education
The village is located in the Fruitport Community Schools district, which also serves Fruitport Charter Township. Fruitport High School, Fruitport Middle School, and Edgewood Elementary School serve the village.  Also located near the village is the private Calvary Christian School.

Climate
This climatic region is typified by large seasonal temperature differences, with warm to hot (and often humid) summers and cold (sometimes severely cold) winters.  According to the Köppen Climate Classification system, Fruitport has a humid continental climate, abbreviated "Dfb" on climate maps.

References

External links

Villages in Muskegon County, Michigan
Villages in Michigan